Shropshire Blue is a cow's milk cheese made in the United Kingdom.

History
The cheese was first made in the 1970s at the Castle Stuart dairy in Inverness, Scotland by Andy Williamson, a cheesemaker who had trained in the making of Stilton cheese in Nottinghamshire. The cheese was first known as 'Inverness-shire Blue' or 'Blue Stuart', but was eventually marketed as 'Shropshire Blue', a name chosen to help increase its popularity, despite it having no link to the county of Shropshire.

An alternative claim to the first production of the cheese, from the Shropshire-based company Westry Roberts, suggests that the cheese originated in the county that it bears the name of in the 1970s; an archived article from 1977 would appear to back up this claim.

A variant, called Ludlow Blue, is now also being made in the county of Shropshire in a small artisan dairy. Ludlow Blue uses carotene as a colouring agent rather than annatto, which makes the colour more yellow.

Description

Shropshire Blue is a blue cheese made from pasteurised cows' milk and uses vegetable rennet. The orange colour comes from the addition of annatto, a natural food colouring. Penicillium roqueforti produces the veining.

The cheese has a deep orange-brown, natural rind and matures for a period of 10–12 weeks with a fat content of about 48 per cent. Made in a similar way to Stilton, it is a soft cheese with a sharp, strong flavour and a slightly tangy aroma. It is slightly sour but sharper than Stilton and generally creamier.

See also
 List of British cheeses

References

External nills 

Shropshire Cheese
The Acton Arms, Morville

Shropshire Cheese

English cheeses
Cow's-milk cheeses
Blue cheeses
Scottish cheeses